Dragon Coaster is the name of several amusement park roller coasters:

Dragon Coaster (Dorney Park), built by Zamperla, Dorney Park & Wildwater Kingdom near Allentown, Pennsylvania
Dragon Coaster (Playland), Playland in Rye, New York
Dragon Coaster (Everland), Everland, Yongin, South Korea